Paljas (meaning "magic" or to cast a spell, English title: "The Clown") is an Afrikaans language South African film that was released in 1997. Paljas was written by Chris Barnard and directed by Katinka Heyns. It is based on the book of the same name.

Awards
The film was submitted for the 70th Academy Award for Best Foreign Film, the first South African submission since the end of Apartheid.

Synopsis
The film revolves around the lives of the rural McDonald family. The household of Hendrik McDonald, stationmaster of the tiny Karoo town, Toorwater ("Magic-water"), experience a number of unexpected situations when a travelling circus troupe leave behind a clown named Manuel. The intrigues of the story include the estranged relationship between Hendrik and his wife Katrien, partly due to her being admired by Frans Lombard. Meanwhile, their daughter Emma is discontented with her suitor, Nollie Kemp, and Willem, the household's youngest, remains withdrawn and refuses to talk. The continued presence of the eccentric clown, Manuel, is kept secret by Willem. Manuel is later cruelly chased and shot by some of the local community who consider him to be evidence of anti-Christian forces despite having succeeded in convincing Willem to communicate and healed much of the family's pain through his caring and fun nature.

See also
 List of submissions to the 70th Academy Awards for Best Foreign Language Film
 List of South African submissions for the Academy Award for Best Foreign Language Film

Bibliography
 Paljas (1998), Allmovie, Synopsis by Bhob Stewart, Access date: 27 May 2022
 Paljas, Afi-Fest (World Cinema - "Description"), Access date: 27 May 2022
 Paljas , Variety, Leonard Klady, 16 March 1998

References

External links
 
MNet All Africa Film Awards

Afrikaans-language films
1997 drama films
1997 films
South African drama films